A constitutional referendum was held in Haiti on 12 June 1918. Voters were asked to approve or reject a new constitution. It was approved by 99.2% of voters.

Results

References

1918 in Haiti
1918 referendums
Initiatives and referendums in Haiti
Constitutional referendums in Haiti
June 1918 events